Josef Theodor Ludwig Eichheim  (23 February 1888 – 13 November 1945) was a German film actor.

Selected filmography
 I Lost My Heart in Heidelberg (1926)
 The Women's War (1928)
 Behind Monastery Walls (1928)
 Peter Voss, Thief of Millions (1932)
 Kiki (1932)
 Night of Temptation (1932)
 S.A.-Mann Brand (1933)
  A Woman Like You (1933)
 Must We Get Divorced? (1933)
 The Love Hotel (1933)
 The Tunnel (1933)
 The Legacy of Pretoria (1934)
 The Switched Bride (1934)
 Between Heaven and Earth (1934)
 Little Dorrit (1934)
 The Tannhof Women (1934)
 The Double (1934)
 Knockout (1935)
 The Blonde Carmen (1935)
 The King's Prisoner (1935)
  The Monastery's Hunter (1935)
 The Hunter of Fall (1936)
 Street Music (1936)
 The Unsuspecting Angel (1936)
 The Voice of the Heart (1937)
 Meiseken (1937)
 Gordian the Tyrant (1937)
 Serenade (1937)
  Storms in May (1938)
 Frau Sixta (1938)
 Three Wonderful Days (1939)
 The Sinful Village (1940)
 Left of the Isar, Right of the Spree (1940)
 Roses in Tyrol (1940)
 Venus on Trial (1941)
 Love is Duty Free (1941)
 The Little Residence (1942)
 Kohlhiesel's Daughters (1943)
 Wild Bird (1943)
 Melody of a Great City (1943)
 Music in Salzburg (1944)
  The Court Concert (1948)

References

External links
 

1888 births
1945 deaths
German male film actors
German male silent film actors
Male actors from Munich
Burials at the Ostfriedhof (Munich)
20th-century German male actors